The Colt Officer's Model or Colt Officer's ACP is a single-action, semi-automatic, magazine-fed, and recoil-operated handgun based on the John M. Browning designed M1911. It was introduced in 1985 as a response from Colt to numerous aftermarket companies making smaller versions of the M1911 pistol.

History
In 1975, Rock Island Arsenal developed a compact M1911 pistol it called the "General Officer's Model Pistol" for issue to general officers of the US Army and Air Force, but the pistol was unavailable for sale to the general public.  The following year, Pat Yates of Detonics had introduced his compact "Combat Master", a chopped down 1911, with 3.5" barrel and a shortened grip frame.  Seeing the popularity of these compact pistols, other pistolsmiths began offering similar conversions on customers' 1911s.

Colt Officer's ACP and Lightweight Officer's ACP
In 1985, Colt developed their own in-house version and named it the "Colt Officer's ACP", the following year they introduced a lighter version with an aluminium frame known as the Lightweight Officer's ACP which weighed 10 ounces less (24 ounces).  The main differences from a full-sized M1911 are 6-round magazines not 7-round, 7 1/8" overall length not 8 1/2", 5 1/8" height not 5 1/2", 34-oz not 39-oz, and most characteristically 3 1/2" barrel not 5".    

An evaluation example tested by the Technical Staff of the National Rifle Association fired 300 rounds with few difficulties.  They reported two failures to feed with wadcutters and one with hardball.  Overall, the review is complimentary for its design cues and small size.  When Colt introduced the 1991 line (a parkerized version of the 1911 with the series 80 firing pin safety), it included a pistol of the same dimensions as the Officer's ACP.

That said, production examples failed to live up to the market's expectations.  An inescapable characteristic of its compact size, the Colt Officer's ACP drew criticism for being finicky with ammunition and the sharp recoil from the short barrel.  Firearms author, Frank James, writes that the decreased velocity from the shorter barrel causes performance of the round to be less than optimal, and a risk if used in a defensive situation.

Reliability and accuracy has been improved through modifications such as replacing the stock barrel bushing with an aftermarket part and judiciously honing the hammer and sear. Beyond trigger work, more sophisticated modifications include replacing the stock hammer and sear with lightweight components, installing a high quality spring set and beveling the inside of the ejection port.

Concealed Carry Officers (CCO) Model
A hybridized variation with a Commander-length barrel-slide and aluminum alloy Officers Model frame. Use of the 4.25" Commander-length slide increases reliability, while retaining the small grip profile and light frame of the Officer's model.  These variants are produced by a number of 1911 manufacturers.
 Alchemy Custom Prime Compact (formerly Brimstone)
 Colt Wiley Clapp CCO (fine line checkering by gunsmith Pete Single)
 Dan Wesson Pointman Carry
 Dan Wesson Vigil CCO
 Fusion Freedom CCO
 Les Baer Stinger
 Nighthawk War Hawk CCO & T3 CCO

References

.45 ACP semi-automatic pistols
1911 platform
Colt semi-automatic pistols
Short recoil firearms
Semi-automatic pistols of the United States
Weapons and ammunition introduced in 1985